Ashir may refer to:

Books
 Matn Ibn Ashir is an Islamic book

People
 Ibn Ashir is a Maliki jurist.
 Ashir Azeem is a Pakistani actor.

Places
 Ashir is an Iranian village.